Passos may refer to:

People
 Cristiano Ávalos dos Passos (born 1977), Brazilian footballer
 John Dos Passos (1896-1970), American novelist
 Márcio Henrique Maia Passos (born 1985), Brazilian footballer
 Marcio Emerson Passos (born 1978), Brazilian footballer
 Pedro Passos Coelho (born 1964), Portuguese Prime Minister
 Rosa Passos (born 1952), Brazilian singer
 Vítor Hugo Gomes Passos (born 1987), Portuguese footballer

Places

Brazil
 Passos, Minas Gerais, a municipality in the State of Minas Gerais
Other variants
 Três Passos, a municipality in the State Rio Grande do Sul
 Ilha do Bom Jesus dos Passos,  an island in the Baía de Todos os Santos, in the municipality of Salvador, State of Bahia

Portugal
 Passos (Cabeceiras de Basto), a civil parish in the municipality of Cabeceiras de Basto
 Passos (Fafe), a civil parish in the municipality of Fafe 
 Passos (Mirandela), a civil parish in Mirandela Municipality
Other variants
 São Julião dos Passos, a civil parish in the municipality of Braga

Other
 Bom Jesus dos Passos, an invocation of Jesus Christ
 Dos Passos Prize (also known as John dos Passos Prize), an annual award for the best currently under-recognized American writer in the middle of their career
 Visconde de Passos

See also
 Passo (disambiguation)

Portuguese-language surnames